Dalljiet Kaur  (born 15 November 1982) is an Indian television actress primarily known for her portrayals of Niyati in Kulvaddhu, Anjali in Iss Pyaar Ko Kya Naam Doon? and Manjiri in Kaala Teeka. She participated and became the winner of Nach Baliye with Shalin Bhanot. In 2019, she participated in the reality show Bigg Boss 13.

Early life
Kaur was born on 15 November 1982 in Ludhiana. She comes from a family of army background. Her father is a retired Colonel and her two elder sisters are in the defence services, as Indian Army officers.

Personal life 
Kaur met Shalin Bhanot while working together in Kulvaddhu, and married him in 2009. They had a son in 2014. In 2015, she filed for divorce accusing Shaleen of domestic violence. Kaur claimed that Bhanot never even visited the doctor with her while she was pregnant. She stated that he accused her of trying to influence the doctors and didn't even want her to have a C-Section. Kaur added that Bhanot was violent towards her even in front of her parents from the start of their marriage. The couple was divorced in 2015. She got married to businessmen Nikhil Patel in 2023.

Career
In 2004, she won the title of Miss Pune, as well as being a finalist in a number of other pageants including, Miss Navy, Miss Mumbai and Miss Maharashtra Queen. She made her television début in the Zee TV drama, Manshaa, and this was followed by appearances in C.I.D., Aahat and Raat Hone Ko Hai. In 2005, she appeared in the show in a cameo role in Kaisa Ye Pyar Hai. Her first role as a protagonist in a drama was in Kulvaddhu as Niyati, a young girl from a royal Jodhpur family.

Following the abrupt ending of Kulvaddhu, Daljeet went on to play Shikha in Chhoona Hai Aasmaan. She also appeared in Star Plus show Santaan from 2007 to 2009.

In 2008, she participated in the dance reality show Nach Baliye in the fourth season and became the winner with ex-husband Shalin Bhanot. In 2011 she played Anjali in Star Plus' show Iss Pyaar Ko Kya Naam Doon?. She later appeared in other shows like Saath Nibhaana Saathiya (2012), Sasural Simar Ka & Rangrasiya (2013).

Kaur made her comeback to television with Colors TV's Swaragini - Jodein Rishton Ke Sur where she played Janki. She later did an episodic appearance in Life OK's Savdhaan India. From 2015 to 2017, she played one of the leads in Zee TV's Kaala Teeka.

In 2017, she portrayed Aadishakti in Maa Shakti. In 2018, she played one of the supporting leads in Star Plus show Qayamat Ki Raat. She later appeared in Silsila Badalte Rishton Ka and Vikram Betaal Ki Rahasya Gatha

In 2019, she essayed the role of antagonist Antara Rawat on the show Guddan Tumse Na Ho Payega which aired on Zee TV. In September 2019, Kaur was a celebrity contestant in the thirteenth season of the Indian version of the reality TV show Big Brother, Bigg Boss.

In May 2021, Kaur appeared in the music video 'Befikar Raho' alongside Asim Riaz's brother Umar Riaz, which she produced as well.

Filmography

Television

Web series

Music videos

References

External links

 
 
 
 Dalljiet Kaur on CelebCouch

1982 births
Living people
Actresses in Hindi television
Indian television actresses
Indian soap opera actresses
Nach Baliye winners
Bigg Boss (Hindi TV series) contestants
People from Ludhiana
Punjabi people
21st-century Indian actresses